"Money Runner" is a song by the Italian Italo disco band Scotch.

Composition 

The song was written by David Zambelli, Naimy Hackett and Fabio Margutti and produced by David and Walter Zambelli.

Charts

References

External links 

 

1986 songs
1986 singles
Scotch (band) songs
ZYX Music singles